is a private university in Setagaya, Tokyo, Japan. The predecessor of the school, a juku, was founded 1922. In 1965 it was chartered as a university.

Access
The campus is about 7 minutes by bus and 20 minutes by foot from Chitose-Karasuyama Station on the Keiō Line. It takes about 25 minutes by bus from Kichijōji Station on the JR Chūō Line.

External links
 Official website 

Educational institutions established in 1922
Private universities and colleges in Japan
Universities and colleges in Tokyo
1922 establishments in Japan
Women's universities and colleges in Japan
Sports universities and colleges
Setagaya